Kempstone is a village.

Kempstone may also refer to:

Thomas Kempstone
Kempstone Hill